Johnny Lyon Hills, are a range of hills, north of the Tres Alamos Wash and the Little Dragoon Mountains in Cochise County, Arizona.

References

Landforms of Cochise County, Arizona